The  is an electric multiple unit (EMU) train type operated by the Tokyo Metropolitan Bureau of Transportation (Toei) in Japan.

Specifications
The trains use SiC–VVVF technology, and are formed as eight-car sets. The interior includes multilingual passenger information displays and security cameras.

The design of the trains revolved around the concept of universal design. This is represented in various features of the trains:

 An open space inside the cars to accommodate passengers with heavy luggage or mobility aids such as wheelchairs
 Widening the space near the doors to facilitate boarding and deboarding at platforms especially during busy times
 Increasing the number of hand straps, handrails, and luggage racks above the seating area

The trains are also fitted with onboard Wi-Fi. In addition, these will be the first trainsets to be equipped with onboard data collection.

Interior

Formation 
The sets are formed as follows.

History
The 6500 series was announced by Toei on 29 October 2020. The first set was delivered in 2020. Test runs are scheduled to start in November 2020. A total of 13 sets, 104 cars, were built by Kinki Sharyo. The 6500 series trainsets made their first trips in revenue service on 14 May 2022, after stations' platforms on Mita Line and Meguro Line were extended to accommodate eight-car trainsets.

The last 6500 series set, 6513, was delivered in August 2022.

On 7 October 2022, Kinki Sharyo announced that the 6500 series received the 2022 Good Design Award.

References

External links

 Press release 

Electric multiple units of Japan
6500
Train-related introductions in 2022
Kinki Sharyo multiple units
1500 V DC multiple units of Japan